Jukia Yoshimura (born 18 February 1993) is a Japanese male  BMX rider, representing his nation at international competitions. He competed in the time trial event at the 2015 UCI BMX World Championships.

References

External links
 
 

1993 births
Living people
BMX riders
Japanese male cyclists
Asian Games competitors for Japan
Cyclists at the 2018 Asian Games
Place of birth missing (living people)